Blackout is the second album by the British band Dominion.

Track listing
 Blackout – 4:12	
 Release – 4:15	
 Covet	– 4:10	
 Distortion – 4:12	
 Ill Effect – 4:26	
 Today's Tomorrow – 4:31
 Down – 3:58	
 Prism	– 3:05
 Threshold – 4:27
 Unseen – 3:18	
 Fuelling Nothing – 3:44

Credits
 Michelle Richfield - vocals
 Mass Firth - vocals, guitar
 Arno Cagna - vocals, guitar
 Danny North - bass
 Bill Law - drums

Dominion (British band) albums